Alexander McLachlan Wilson (11 December 1920 – 29 February 2004) was a member of the Queensland Legislative Assembly.

Biography
Wilson was born in Rockhampton, Queensland, the son of Robert Wilson and his wife Jane McWilliam (née McLachlan). He was educated at Stuart Creek State School and on leaving worked for the Queensland Railways as a locomotive fireman and also a railway wagon-builder.

On 8 May 1946 he married Sybil Maud Corney (died 2006) and together had three sons and four daughters. Wilson died in Townsville in February 2004.

Public career
Wilson won the seat of Townsville South for the Labor Party at the 1977 Queensland state election, defeating the sitting member, Tom Aikens, who had served the parliament for over 33 years. He represented the electorate until the 1986 Queensland state election when Townsville South was abolished.

Always in opposition, Wilson was the shadow minister for the following portfolios:
 Opposition Spokesman for Water Resources and Aboriginal Affairs 1981-1982
 Opposition Spokesman for Works and Water Resources 1982
 Opposition Spokesman for Transport and Main Roads 1982
 Opposition Spokesman for Northern Development and Maritime Services 1982-1983
 Opposition Spokesman on Works and Workers' Compensation 1983

References

Members of the Queensland Legislative Assembly
1920 births
2004 deaths
Australian Labor Party members of the Parliament of Queensland
20th-century Australian politicians